CiteScore (CS) of an academic journal is a measure reflecting the yearly average number of citations to recent articles published in that journal. This journal evaluation metric was launched in December 2016 by Elsevier as an alternative to the generally used JCR impact factors (calculated by Clarivate). CiteScore is based on the citations recorded in the Scopus database rather than in JCR, and those citations are collected for articles published in the preceding four years instead of two or five.

Calculation

In any given year, the CiteScore of a journal is the number of citations, received in that year and previous 3 years, for documents published in the journal during that period (four years), divided by the total number of published documents (articles, reviews, conference papers, book chapters, and data papers) in the journal during the same four-year period:

For example, Nature had a CiteScore 2021 of 70.2:

Note that for example the 2017 CiteScores were reported first in 2018 when all data was available completely. CiteScores are typically released in late May, approximately one month earlier than the JCR impact factors. Scopus also provides the projected CiteScores for the next year, which are updated every month.

Old calculation 

Before 2020, the score was calculated differently: In a given year, the CiteScore of a journal was the number of citations received in that year of articles published in that journal during the three preceding years, divided by the total number of "citable items" published in that journal during the three preceding years:

For example, Nature had a CiteScore of 14.456 in 2017:

Because the calculation method changed, knowing the calculation date is an important detail when comparing CiteScores. For example, the Nature CiteScore for 2017 calculated with the post-2020 method is 53.7.

CiteScore vs. Journal Impact Factor

CiteScore was designed to compete with the two-year JCR impact factor, which is currently the most widely used journal metric. Their main differences are as follows: 

Another difference is the definition of the "number of publications" or "citable items".

References

Journal ranking